Ilona Melnichenko is a former ice dancer who competed for the Soviet Union. With former partner Gennady Kaskov, she is the 1987 World Junior champion and 1991 Winter Universiade champion. She is from Odessa and has a bachelor's degree in Physical Education from the Odessa State Institute of Physical Culture. Melnichenko was married to former pair skater Artem Torgeshev, the 1987 World Junior silver medalist, with whom she has two children, Andrew and Deana. They coach at the Panthers Figure Skating Club, Saveology Iceplex in Coral Springs, Florida. Together they have coached many notable skaters, including Franchesca Chiera, Sophia Chouinard, Samantha Scott, Luiz Manella, and Andrew Torgashev. Their son, Andrew Torgashev, was born May 29, 2001 in Coral Springs, Florida and competes for the United States in single skating.

Results
(with Kaskov)

References

Navigation

Soviet female ice dancers
Ukrainian female ice dancers
Living people
Year of birth missing (living people)
Sportspeople from Odesa
World Junior Figure Skating Championships medalists
Ukrainian emigrants to the United States
Universiade medalists in figure skating
Universiade gold medalists for the Soviet Union
Universiade silver medalists for the Soviet Union
Competitors at the 1989 Winter Universiade
Competitors at the 1991 Winter Universiade